The NBA All-Star Game Kobe Bryant Most Valuable Player (MVP) is an annual National Basketball Association (NBA) award given to the player(s) voted best of the annual All-Star Game. The award was established in 1953 when NBA officials decided to designate an MVP for each year's game. The league also re-honored players from the previous two All-Star Games. Ed Macauley and Paul Arizin were selected as the 1951 and 1952 MVP winners respectively. The winner is voted upon by a panel of media members, who cast their vote after the conclusion of the game. The fan voting accounts for 25% of the voting. The player(s) with the most votes or ties for the most votes wins the award. In February 2020, Commissioner Adam Silver renamed the NBA All-Star Game Most Valuable Player in honor of four-time winner Kobe Bryant, who died in a helicopter crash a few weeks earlier.

, the most recent recipient is Boston Celtics  forward Jayson Tatum. Bryant and Bob Pettit are the only two players to win the All-Star Game MVP four times. Oscar Robertson, Michael Jordan, Shaquille O'Neal, and LeBron James have each won the award three times, while Bob Cousy, Julius Erving, Isiah Thomas, Magic Johnson, Karl Malone, Allen Iverson, Russell Westbrook, and Kevin Durant have all won the award twice. James became the youngest to win the award in 2006 at the age of 21 years and 1 month. No All-Star Game MVP was named in 1999 since the game was canceled due to the league's lockout. Four of the games had joint winners—Elgin Baylor and Pettit in 1959, John Stockton and Malone in 1993, O'Neal and Tim Duncan in 2000, and O'Neal and Bryant in 2009. O'Neal became the first player in All-Star history to share two MVP awards as well as the first player to win the award with multiple teams. The Los Angeles Lakers have had eleven winners while the Boston Celtics have had nine. Duncan of the U.S. Virgin Islands, Kyrie Irving of Australia, and Giannis Antetokounmpo of Greece are the only winners not born in the United States. Both Duncan and Irving are American citizens, but are considered "international" players by the NBA because they were not born in one of the fifty states or Washington, D.C. Antetokounmpo of Greece is the only winner to be trained entirely outside the U.S.; Irving lived in the U.S. since age two, and Duncan played U.S. college basketball at Wake Forest.

Bob Pettit (1958, 1959) and Russell Westbrook (2015, 2016) are the only players to win consecutive awards. Pettit (1956), Bob Cousy (1957), Wilt Chamberlain (1960), Bill Russell (1963), Oscar Robertson (1964), Willis Reed (1970), Dave Cowens (1973), Michael Jordan (1988, 1996, 1998), Magic Johnson (1990),  Shaquille O'Neal (2000), and Allen Iverson (2001) all won the All-Star Game MVP and the NBA Most Valuable Player Award in the same season; Jordan is the only player to do this multiple times. Fourteen players have won the award playing for the team that hosted the All-Star Game: Macauley (1951), Cousy (1957), Pettit (1958, 1962), Chamberlain (1960), Adrian Smith (1966), Rick Barry (1967), Jerry West (1972), Tom Chambers (1987), Michael Jordan (1988), Karl Malone (1993), John Stockton (1993), O'Neal (2004, 2009), Bryant (2011) and Davis (2017); Pettit and O'Neal did this multiple times. Kareem Abdul-Jabbar has the distinction of playing in the most All-Star Games (18) without winning the All-Star Game MVP, while Adrian Smith won the MVP in his only All-Star Game.

Winners

Multi-time winners

Teams

See also

NBA Most Valuable Player Award
Bill Russell NBA Finals Most Valuable Player Award
NBA Conference Finals Most Valuable Player Award
List of NBA All-Stars
List of NBA All-Star vote leaders

Notes

References
General

Specific

All-Star Game MVP
National Basketball Association lists
MVP
Awards established in 1953
Kobe Bryant
Basketball most valuable player awards